Patrick Dulleck (born 15 February 1990) is a German professional footballer who plays as a striker for Regionalliga Südwest club SSV Ulm 1846.

Career
Dulleck began his career with Karlsruher SC and  made his debut for the club in October 2009, as a substitute for Niklas Tarvajärvi in a 1–0 defeat to Fortuna Düsseldorf in the 2. Bundesliga. He signed for SV Elversberg at the end of the 2013–14 season.

References

External links
 
 

Living people
1990 births
Association football forwards
German footballers
Karlsruher SC II players
Karlsruher SC players
SV Elversberg players
TSV Steinbach Haiger players
FC 08 Homburg players
SSV Ulm 1846 players
2. Bundesliga players
3. Liga players
Regionalliga players